Rodrigue Ossandza is a Congolese judoka.

Achievements

References

Democratic Republic of the Congo male judoka
Living people
Year of birth missing (living people)